Donald Scott Smith (13 February 1955 – 30 November 2000) was a Canadian musician and the bassist for Canadian rock band Loverboy. The band are best known for their hit singles "Working for the Weekend" and "Turn Me Loose", although their U.S. Top Ten hits were "Lovin' Every Minute of It" in 1985 and "This Could Be the Night" in 1986. The band won six Juno Awards in 1982 and has sold over 23 million records.

Early life
Smith was born in Winnipeg, Manitoba. He originally studied guitar, and at the age of twelve moved to bass.

Career
Smith was majoring in English at the University of Manitoba when he received a call from Loverboy guitarist Paul Dean in Vancouver inviting him to replace bassist Jim Clench in the newly-formed band.  In addition to playing bass for the band, Smith also co-wrote a few of the band's songs including the 1983 rock hit "Lucky Ones".

After Loverboy disbanded in 1988, Smith was part of the band Dangerous, along with Mike Reno and Brian MacLeod. He also worked as a late-night radio DJ at CFOX, albeit briefly. Loverboy got back together for a benefit concert in 1991, and then reunited in 1993 and continued touring through the 1990s. Smith said in an interview, "We're back because we like to rock and simply because promoters want to book us."

Death
On 30 November 2000, Smith was sailing his boat, the 11-metre (36-foot) Sea Major, with two friends off the coast of San Francisco near the Golden Gate Bridge, when a large wave swept him overboard. Searches conducted by the Coast Guard and a private company hired by friends and family were unsuccessful. Smith was pronounced missing presumed dead, lost at sea.

Personal life
Smith lived in Maple Ridge, British Columbia, and had two sons.

Discography

with Loverboy
 Loverboy (1980)
 Get Lucky (1981)
 Keep It Up (1983)
 Lovin' Every Minute of It (1985)
 Wildside (1987)
 Six (1997)
 Unfinished Business (2014, posthumous)

See also
List of people who disappeared mysteriously at sea

References

External links
 "Loverboy" Canadian Historical website
 Official Loverboy website

1955 births
2000 deaths
2000s missing person cases
20th-century Canadian bass guitarists
21st-century Canadian bass guitarists
Canadian rock bass guitarists
Loverboy members
Missing person cases in California
People lost at sea